Milea (before 1926: Καρλάτ - Karlat; Macedonian and , Karladovo),  or Kırlat) is a village in the Exaplatanos municipal unit of the Pella regional unit of Macedonia, Greece. It has a population of 558; with the neighboring village Rizochori, the population is 1,001 (2011).

Milea had 787 inhabitants in 1981. In fieldwork done by Riki Van Boeschoten in late 1993, Milea was populated by a Greek population descended from Anatolian Greek refugees who arrived during the Greek-Turkish population exchange, and Slavophones. The Macedonian language was spoken in the village by people over 30 in public and private settings. Children understood the language, but mostly did not use it. Turkish was spoken in the village by people over 30 in public and private settings. Children understood the language, but mostly did not use it.

References

Populated places in Pella (regional unit)